Adelaide Island is an island located in Franz Josef Land, Russian Federation, in the north-east of the archipelago, which lies in the Kara Sea.

It is one of three glaciated islands that comprise Belaya Zemlya, a geographical subgroup of the Franz Josef archipelago.

Adelaide Island was discovered by Fridtjof Nansen and Hjalmar Johansen on 9 August 1895 on their return journey from an attempt to reach the North Pole. Nansen named the island after his mother .

See also 
 List of islands of Russia

References

External links 

Islands of Franz Josef Land